The 1953–54 Macedonian Republic League was the tenth since its establishment. Pobeda Prilep won their second championship title.

Participating teams

Final table

References 
Karovski, Ilija (1996) FK Tikvesh 1930–1995 p. 42, 43, 44, 45

External links
SportSport.ba
Football Federation of Macedonia 

Macedonian Football League seasons
Yugo
3